The United States national under-23 rugby union team (known as the Men's Collegiate All-Americans) represents the United States in rugby union at U23 level. It is currently sponsored by multinational insurance corporation, AIG.

Recent results
The following table shows the results in official matches played by the Men's Collegiate All-Americans (score always listed first). The list may be incomplete.

Roster
The following is the Roster for the 2016 Queensland Tour.

Management
Gavin Hickie - Head Coach
Greg McWilliams - Assistant Coach
James Willocks - Assistant Coach
Justin Hickey - Manager
Ben Schuler - Athletic Trainer

See also
 United States national under-20 rugby union team (Junior All Americans)

References

External links
 

United States national rugby union team
College rugby union in the United States